Mondawmin Mall is a three-level shopping mall in West Baltimore, Maryland, United States. The mall was a development of the Mondawmin Corporation, a firm set up in 1952 by James Rouse and Hunter Moss under the Moss-Rouse Company. When it first opened in October 1956, it had an open-air plan and was called the Mondawmin Center. It was later enclosed and renamed the Mondawmin Mall.

History

In 1841, Patrick Macaulay (1795–1849) constructed a Greek Revival mansion on 73 acres that he named Mondawmin Manor. Macaulay was a Baltimore City councilman, doctor, editor of the Baltimore North American and early director of the B&O railroad. It is a common misconception that poet Henry Wadsworth Longfellow suggested to Macaulay that he should name the estate after a Native American god of corn, Mondamin, referenced in the poem "The Song of Hiawatha." However, this poem was written after the naming of Mondawmin, making this etymology anachronistic. The name Mondawmin is derived from an Ojibwe word for corn. The specific reason for the name is not known, but Macaulay was known to have taken an interest in Native American anthropology. Upon Macaulay's death, George Brown purchased Mondawmin and it was owned and maintained by the Brown family until 1949. The only remaining feature from the original estate is a marble fountain that can be found in Frederick, Maryland. In 1949, Alexander Brown Griswold approached James Rouse and asked what he could develop on 46 acres of property on the outskirts of Baltimore City. Rouse proposed the idea of a shopping center and the estate was demolished for development in 1955.

Mondawmin Center was built as an urban retail hub. It was an open-air complex of 58 store spaces, featuring a spiral staircase, a three-level Sears, a G.C. Murphy 5 and 10, and Food Fair and Penn Fruit supermarkets. Jim Rouse's brother Willard Goldsmith Rouse arranged the initial leasing, which included "The White Coffee Pot", a store that opened as a segregated establishment. The center was fully enclosed during renovations that started in 1963 and its name was changed to Mondawmin Mall.

After the 1968 Baltimore riots produced white flight, the mall revenues declined and Sears left. Vacant space was occupied by the department of social services, where 35 people were held hostage in May 1977 by an unemployed man facing court action. The Rouse Company had sold the Mondawmin Mall property in the mid-1960s, only to buy it back in 1982. They performed a large-scale renovation in 1983, sectioning the vacant Sears into smaller store spaces and adding a parking garage to the west end of the structure. 

With the acquisition of the Rouse Company by Chicago-based General Growth Properties, in 2004, Mondawmin Mall became a GGP holding. General Growth Properties went through bankruptcy proceedings between April 2009 and May 2010. Once criticized for not meeting the needs of the local population, it is now better serving the community following a $68 million renovation between early 2007 and late 2008. During this project, the parking garage was demolished and replaced with a Target store. Two anchors, A.J. Wright (which later became Marshalls) and Shoppers Food & Pharmacy, were added to the east end of the shopping center.

A branch of the Motor Vehicle Administration (MVA) of Maryland was on the Mondawmin property in a separate building. In 2011, the MVA moved to Hilltop Plaza Shopping Center in northwest Baltimore.

During the 2015 Baltimore riots, police protected the Mondawmin Mall for a short period of time, eventually closing in the mid afternoon. Other images of the Mondawmin Mall appeared on major news networks showing looters running into and out of the mall during the riots. The riots were a reaction to the police murder of Freddie Grey but were instigated by the Baltimore Police when they sealed off the transit hub at Mondawmin. Students from nearby schools were trying to get home but were stranded there, creating further animosity towards the police.  The mall remained closed from Monday, 27 April 2015, until Saturday, 2 May 2015, and reopened on Sunday, 3 May 2015.

On November 7, 2017, Target announced that its Mondawmin store would close in February 2018.

In popular culture
Mondawmin Mall was prominently featured in the movie Species II, 1998, starring Michael Madsen and Marg Helgenberger.

Transportation

The perimeter of the Mondawmin Mall property is composed of some major Baltimore roads, including Liberty Heights Avenue, Reisterstown Road, and Gwynns Falls Parkway. Also nearby are Maryland Route 129 and Monroe Street.

Located on the Mondawmin property is the Mondawmin Transit Center, which mainly includes Mondawmin station of the Baltimore Metro Subway. This station serves as a hub for 10 Maryland Transit Administration bus lines. There are also 175 spaces in the mall's parking lot designated for use by riders of the Metro Subway.

References

External links
Mondawmin Mall on Google Street View

Mondawmin, Baltimore
Shopping malls in Maryland
Brookfield Properties
Buildings and structures in Baltimore
Shopping malls established in 1956
1956 establishments in Maryland